Johannes Vanja (1893 – 1937 Soviet Union) was an Estonian politician. He was a member of I Riigikogu. since 7 January 1921. He replaced Jüri Rooberg. On 29 September 1922, he resigned his position and was replaced by Johannes Reesen.

References

1893 births
1937 deaths
Estonian Independent Socialist Workers' Party politicians
Members of the Riigikogu, 1920–1923
Prisoners and detainees of Estonia
Estonian emigrants to the Soviet Union
Great Purge victims from Estonia